George Carey Foster FRS (October 1835 – 9 February 1919) was a chemist and physicist, born at Sabden in Lancashire. He was Professor of Physics at University College London, and served as the first Principal (salaried head of the College) from 1900 to 1904. The Carey Foster bridge is named after him.

References

External links
The Carey Foster Bridge, description and image at Kenyon College

British chemists
British physicists
1835 births
1919 deaths
People from Ribble Valley (district)
Fellows of the Royal Society
Presidents of the Physical Society
Alumni of University College London
Academics of University College London
Scientists from Lancashire